Peter T. Wild (April 25, 1940 – February 23, 2009) was a poet, historian, and professor of English at the University of Arizona in Tucson, Arizona. Born in Northampton, Massachusetts, he grew up in and graduated from high school in Easthampton, Massachusetts. Wild worked as a rancher and firefighter for the U.S. Forest Service, and served as a lieutenant with the U.S. Army in Germany. Wild earned his M.F.A. in 1969 from the University of California, Irvine. He then began teaching for nearly 40 years and wrote over 2,000 poems; also, he edited or wrote some 80 fiction and non-fiction books, largely dealing with the American West. His 1973 volume of poetry, Cochise, a eulogy to the Chiricahua Apache Indians and their leader Cochise, was nominated for the Pulitzer Prize in Poetry.


Bibliography
 Poetry
 
 
 
 
 
   (print and on-line)
   (print and on-line)
 
 
 
   (Editor, with Frank Graziano; print and on-line)
 
 University of Utah Press – Salt Lake City (as editor)
 
 Republished as: 
 
 
   (print and on-line)
   (print and on-line)
 Boise State University Western Writers Series (BSUWWS #) – Boise, Idaho
 Alberto Ríos (#131). 1998. pp. 51. . 
 Álvar Núñez Cabeza de Vaca (#101). 1991. pp. 51. .  (print and on-line)
 Ann Zwinger (#111). 1993. pp. 51. . 
 Barry Lopez (#94). 1984. pp. 49. . 
 Clarence King (#48). 1981. pp. 46. . 
 Desert Literature: The Early Period (#146). 2001. pp. 51. . 
 Desert Literature: The Middle Period: J. Smeaton Chase, Edna Brush Perkins, and Edwin Corle (#138). 1999. pp. 53. . 
 Desert Literature: The Modern Period (#144). 2000. pp. 52. . 
 Enos Mills (#36). Cover design and illustration by Arny Skov. 1979. pp. 47. . 
 George Wharton James (#93). 1990. pp. 52. . 
 J. Ross Browne (#157). 2003. pp. 49. . 
 James Welch (#57). 1983. pp. 49. . 
 John C. Van Dyke: The Desert (#82). 1988. pp. 52. . 
 John Haines (#68). 1985. pp. 51. . 
 John Nichols (#75). 1986. pp. 52. . 
 Theodore Strong Van Dyke (#121). 1995. pp. 54. . 
 The Shady Myrick Research Project – Johannesburg, California
 
 
 
 
 
 
 Other publishers:
   (print and on-line)
   (print and on-line)
 Daggett: Life in a Mojave Frontier. Van Dyke, Dix. Baltimore, MD: Johns Hopkins University Press. pp. 183. .  (print and on-line)
   (print and on-line)

Notes

 Peters, Robert (October–November 1974). "Mud Men Mud Women". Margins. Vol. 14. pp. 57 ff.
 Republished in Robert Peters (1979). The Great American Poetry Bake-off. Metuchen, NJ: Scarecrow Press. pp. 274. .  (print and on-line)
 Seavey, Ormond (Spring 1975). "Peter Wild: An Introduction". New York: Little Magazine. Vol. 9, pp. 4–10. (Available in the Little Magazine archive, 1965–1988, at the Harry Ransom Humanities Research Center (HRC): University of Texas at Austin, .)

External links
 University of Arizona Archives: Papers of Peter Wild 1989–2004 – an index of Wild's research regarding John C. Van Dyke, 
 
 
 
 
 

1940 births
2009 deaths
20th-century American historians
21st-century American historians
20th-century American poets
21st-century American poets
American academics of English literature
American literary historians
American male poets
Historians of the American West
Literary historians
Poets from Arizona
United States Army officers
University of Arizona faculty
University of California, Irvine alumni
Writers from Northampton, Massachusetts
Writers from Tucson, Arizona
20th-century American male writers
21st-century American male writers
American male non-fiction writers
Historians from Massachusetts
Military personnel from Massachusetts